Dence may refer to:
 4340 Dence, a main-belt asteroid, named after Michael R. Dence
 Maggie Dence (born 1942), an Australian actress